The Hundred of Willunga is a cadastral unit of hundred covering the extreme south suburbs of the Adelaide metropolitan area. It is one of the eleven hundreds of the County of Adelaide. It was named in 1846 by Governor Frederick Robe probably deriving from a Kaurna/Ngarrindjeri place label willannga, meaning place of green trees.

The hundred is bounded on the north by the Onkaparinga River and includes part of the McLaren Vale wine region.  The bounds of the Hundred of Willunga span the southern half of the contemporary City of Onkaparinga local government area, including localities south of the Onkaparinga and west of Kangarilla and Kuitpo.

Local government
The District Council of Willunga was established in 1853 to govern the hundred. By 1856, residents on the northern boundary at Noarlunga had seceded from the council along with parts of Morphett Vale over the Onkaparinga River to form the District Council of Noarlunga. The following year, residents of Aldinga successfully lobbied for their own independent local governance and the District Council of Aldinga was formed. In 1932 Aldinga was dissolved and the land absorbed back into Willunga council. In 1997 Willunga council was amalgamated with Noarlunga and Happy Valley councils to the north to form the City of Onkaparinga, spanning both the Hundred of Willunga and Hundred of Noarlunga.

Towns and other localities
The following Adelaide seaside suburbs and semi-urban localities are located within the hundred:
 Port Noarlunga South
 Seaford Meadows
 Seaford
 Moana
 Old Noarlunga (south of Onkaparinga River)
 Seaford Rise
 Seaford Heights
 Maslin Beach
 Port Willunga
 Aldinga Beach
 Sellicks Beach

The following semi-rural towns and localities are located within the hundred:
 Blewitt Springs
 McLaren Vale
 McLaren Flat
 Tatachilla
 The Range (north-western half)
 Aldinga
 Whites Valley
 Willunga
 Sellicks Hill
 Willunga South

See also
Lands administrative divisions of South Australia

References

Willunga